is the pen name of a Japanese manga artist and writer whose real name and date of birth are unknown. He is best known for his manga series The Promised Neverland.

Early life
Kaiu Shirai was doing Kabuki at a young age and then after graduating from university, Shirai gained employment at a normal company, but later resigned. Aiming to become a professional manga artist, he began to submit manuscripts to editors and magazines.

Career history
On 21 June 2015, Kaiu Shirai published his first professional work, a standalone piece called, The Location of Ashley-Gate, in Shōnen Jump+, a digital imprint of Shueisha, with art by Kyousuke Maruyama. Again, in the same magazine, he published his second work, another standalone piece called, Poppy's Wish, in collaboration with artist Posuka Demizu on 18 February 2016.

After that, Shirai created a serialized work based on drafts written while he was still an amateur. This work, The Promised Neverland, (with art by Posuka Demizu) started its run in the 35th issue of Weekly Shōnen Jump on 1 August 2016 and finished in the 28th issue of the magazine on 15 June 2020. Along with manga artist Posuka Demizu, Shirai published two one-shots in 2020 and 2021. The first one, Spirit Photographer Saburo Kono was published in the combined issue No. 36 – No. 37, 2020 of Weekly Shōnen Jump; the second one is titled DC3, published in the same magazine in issue No. 35 of 2021. On 3 September 2021, Kaiu Shirai x Posuka Demizu: Beyond The Promised Neverland was published, which included works and one-shots in combination with Posuka Demizu.

A collaborative exhibition titled Miroirs manga meets Chanel by Kaiu Shirai, Posuka Demizu and Chanel was held at Chanel Nexus Hall Ginza, Chūō, Tokyo, from 28 April to 4 June 2021. The manga Miroirs, written and illustrated by the duo, was inspired by the Chanel brand. In this exhibition, scenes from Miroirs are exhibited alongside precious works from Chanel. The manga was published by Shueisha on 30 April 2021. In 2022, Shirai participated as a judge at Shōnen Jump+'''s 7th Stokin Pro Garyokin 2022, to discover new talented manga artists.

Influences
Kaiu Shirai commented that he was influenced by manga artists Osamu Tezuka, Naoki Urasawa, Yoshihiro Togashi and Eiichiro Oda; Directors Akira Kurosawa, Kōki Mitani, Kentaro Kobayashi and Hayao Miyazaki; with Kabuki actor Kanzaburo Nakamura XVIII as personalities that influenced him the most.

Works
Manga
  (art by Posuka Demizu, serialized in Weekly Shōnen Jump, 2016–2020).
 Miroirs (art by Posuka Demizu, 2021).

One-shots
 The Location of Ashley-Gate (art by Kyousuke Maruyama, Shōnen Jump+, 2015).
 Kaiu Shirai x Posuka Demizu: Beyond The Promised Neverland (白井カイウ×出水ぽすか短編集, Shirai kaiu × Demizu posuka Tanhenshū) (2021) — Collected volume of Shirai's one-shots published by Shueisha.
 Poppy's Wish (art by Posuka Demizu, Shōnen Jump+, 2016).
 Spirit Photographer Saburo Kono (art by Posuka Demizu, Weekly Shōnen Jump, Issue No. 36, 2020–Issue No. 37, 2020).
 Dreams Come True (art by Posuka Demizu).
 We Were Born (art by Posuka Demizu, Weekly Shōnen Jump, Issue #5–#6, 2021).
 DC3 (art by Posuka Demizu, Weekly Shōnen Jump, Issue No. 35, 2021).

Awards

See also
 Kaiu Shirai x Posuka Demizu: Beyond The Promised Neverland''

References

External links

Living people
Manga writers
Year of birth missing (living people)